These are the results of the Men's 95 kg (also known as Half Heavyweight) competition in judo at the 1996 Summer Olympics in Atlanta, Georgia.  A total of 32 men competed in this event, limited to jūdōka whose body weight was less than, or equal to, 95 kilograms.  Competition took place in the Georgia World Congress Center.

The gold and silver medals were determined by a single-elimination tournament, with the winner of the final taking gold and the loser receiving silver.  Judo events awarded two bronze medals.  Quarterfinal losers competed in a repechage match for the right to face a semifinal loser for a bronze medal (that is, the judokas defeated in quarterfinals A and B competed against each other, with the winner of that match facing the semifinal loser from the other half of the bracket).

Tournament results

First round
As there were more than 32 qualifiers for the tournament, three first round matches were held to reduce the field to 32 judoka.
  defeated

Main bracket
The gold and silver medalists were determined by the final match of the main single-elimination bracket.

Repechage
The losing semifinalists as well as those judoka eliminated in earlier rounds by the four semifinalists of the main bracket advanced to the repechage.  These matches determined the two bronze medalists for the event.

References

External links
 

M95
Judo at the Summer Olympics Men's Half Heavyweight
Men's events at the 1996 Summer Olympics